Quillo (from Quechua Q'illu, meaning "yellow") is one of eight districts of the Yungay Province in Peru.

Geography 
Other mountains are listed below:

Ethnic groups 
The people in the district are mainly indigenous citizens of Quechua descent. Quechua is the language which the majority of the population (96.11%) learnt to speak in childhood, 3.74% of the residents started speaking using the Spanish language (2007 Peru Census).

See also 
 Qanchisqucha

References

States and territories established in 1857
1857 establishments in Peru
Districts of the Yungay Province
Districts of the Ancash Region